Telugu states are the Indian states of Andhra Pradesh and Telangana in southeastern India. An ethno-region of Telugu people, they as a collective are bordered by Maharashtra to the north, Karnataka to the west, Odisha, Chhattisgarh to the northeast, Tamil Nadu to the south and the Bay of Bengal, Yanam district enclave of Puducherry to the east. The referential term of Telugu states has been in use ever since the bifurcation of its preceding political entity United Andhra Pradesh in 2014. Combining Telangana's population of 35,193,978 and Andhra Pradesh's of 49,506,799, the Telugu states have a population of 84,700,777 as of 2011.

History 

The Telugu states names of   Andhra Pradesh and Telangana were the historical popular ethnonym for the Telugu ethno-region as a whole before the States Reorganisation Act in 1956 due to which the Telugu states modern defined boundaries exist. Prior to the Indian Independence Act, the present Telugu states were part of the British suzerain Hyderabad state of the Nizam and Madras Presidency of the British Crown.

Culture

Cuisine

The cuisine of Telugu states is generally known for its tangy, hot and spicy taste, the cooking is very diverse due to the vast spread of the people and varied topological regions.

Media
There are several newspapers and TV Channels which cater to the audience of both Telugu states.

Cinema

Telugu cinema is the segment of Indian cinema dedicated to the production of motion pictures in the Telugu language, widely spoken in Telugu states. Telugu cinema is based in Film Nagar, a neighborhood of Hyderabad, India.

Language
Telugu is spoken across the Telugu states. As of 2022, Urdu has also gained Official status in both the states. Telugu stands alongside Hindi and English as one of the few languages with primary official language status in more than one Indian state. It is one of six languages designated a classical language of India by the country's government.

References

Telugu language